The 2022 Edmonton Elks season was the 64th season for the team in the Canadian Football League and their 73rd overall. The Elks improved upon their league-worst  record from 2021, but were eliminated from playoff qualification on October 8 following a loss to the Winnipeg Blue Bombers. The Elks set a dubious record for most consecutive home losses when they lost for the 15th straight time at home on October 1, surpassing the Ottawa Rough Riders and their 14-game home losing streak from 1987 to 1988. The team finished winless at home for the second straight season and extended their CFL record to 17 consecutive home losses.

The team's 2022 season was the first under general manager Chris Jones. It was also the third season overall for Edmonton with Jones as head coach, with Jones having coached the team to its most recent title in 2015. The team's previous head coach, general manager, and president, Jaime Elizondo, Brock Sunderland, and Chris Presson, respectively, were fired following the 2021 season.

The club discontinued the use of the antler helmet logo it adopted the previous season alongside its name change to Elks, and replaced it with a version of the traditional "EE" logo it used while playing under its former nickname, the Eskimos.

Offseason

CFL Global Draft
The 2022 CFL Global Draft took place on May 3. The Elks had three selections in the snake draft.

CFL National Draft
The 2022 CFL Draft took place on May 3. The Elks had the first overall pick, but traded down to the fourth selection following a trade with the Montreal Alouettes for the playing rights for Carter O'Donnell. The team acquired additional first and third round selections after trading Kyle Saxelid and Grant McDonald to the Hamilton Tiger-Cats. The Elks also traded a second-round pick to the Toronto Argonauts in exchange for Nick Arbuckle. The team had ten selections in the eight-round draft due to being awarded a territorial selection in the second round.

Preseason

Regular season

Season standings

Season schedule

Team

Roster

Coaching staff

References

External links
 

Edmonton Elks seasons
2022 Canadian Football League season by team
2022 in Alberta